Gilda Marchiò (1884–1954) was an Italian theatre actress. She also appeared in a number of films in the 1940s, her performances including a small role in the 1942 propaganda film Odessa in Flames.

Selected filmography
 The Betrothed (1941)
 A Garibaldian in the Convent (1942)
 Odessa in Flames (1942)
 Rossini (1942)
 The Two Orphans (1942)
 In High Places (1943)
 Short Circuit (1943)

References

Bibliography
 Susan Bassnett & Jennifer Lorch. Luigi Pirandello in the Theatre. Routledge, 2014.

External links

1884 births
1954 deaths
Italian film actresses
Italian stage actresses
Actors from Florence